Trap Branch is a stream in Henry County in the U.S. state of Missouri.

Trap Branch was named for the fact a large portion of the early settlers were trappers.

See also
List of rivers of Missouri

References

Rivers of Henry County, Missouri
Rivers of Missouri